Peäro August Pitka (1865-1915), also known for his pseudonym Ansomardi, was an Estonian children's writer and officer in the Russian czarist army. His brother was Johan Pitka, a rear admiral and hero of the Estonian War of Independence.

Books

Stories
 Jalgsemaa Kitse-eide muinasjutud (1901)
 Kaks sündinud lugu (1904)
 Poolik elu (1904)
 Elu-pudemed (1909)
 Sõja päivilt (1910)
 Lastejutud (1911)
 Jalgsemaa Kitse-eide muinasjutud ja teisi jutte (1979)

Plays
 Murieide tütar (1900)
 Matsil unes, teistel ilmsi (1901)

Miscellaneous
 Võimlemise ehk Gümnastika õpetus (1904)
 Sõjamehe sõnastik (1914)

References

External links
 Ansomardi at Estonian Writers' Online Dictionary

1865 births
1915 deaths